Guzmania poortmanii is a species of plant in the family Bromeliaceae. It is endemic to Ecuador.  Its natural habitat is subtropical or tropical moist montane forests. It is threatened by habitat loss.

References

poortmanii
Endemic flora of Ecuador
Critically endangered flora of South America
Taxonomy articles created by Polbot
Taxa named by Carl Christian Mez
Taxa named by Édouard André